Hybomyia is a genus of flies in the family Empididae.

Species
H. oliveri Plant, 1995

References

Empidoidea genera
Empididae